The Pedvāle Open Air Art Museum is a State Historical Monument near Sabile, Talsi Municipality, Latvia. It was founded in 1992 by Ojārs Arvīds Feldbergs as a setting for environmental art.

Abava River Valley

The museum preserves the cultural landscape of the Abava River valley.

Art at Pedvale
The museum has a permanent collection of more than 150 outdoor sculptures by an international group of artists. It was the site of the 7th International Conference on Contemporary Cast Iron Art in 2014.

White Princess
The park is said to be the residence of the White Princess, a Latvian ghost.  She is more often felt than seen, and it said to draw people to come back, or to stay at Pedvāle.

Flora and fauna
The park contains native Latvian plants and animals, to fulfill its mission to preserve the scenic landscapes of the Abava Valley.  Blooming wildflowers include lupins, which are in bloom for the summer solstice.  Amimals include the hedgehog, Eurasian beaver, and deer.  Birds include the stork and cuckoo.
03

Awards
The museum shared the UNESCO award for preservation and development of the cultural landscape in 1999.
  In 1999 the activities at Pedvāle museum were recognized and awarded the UNESCO Melina Mercuri International Prize for the Safeguarding and Management of Cultural Landscapes.

References

External links
 Pedvāle Open Air Museum Home Page
 Review from the International Sculpture Center

Sculpture gardens, trails and parks in Europe
Art museums and galleries in Latvia
1992 establishments in Latvia